Aquapalace Prague is the biggest water park in the Czech Republic. It was opened on May 5, 2008. It has both indoor and outdoor areas, which are connected. The main water park has 9,150 m2 and is made up of three palaces: Palace of Treasures, Palace of Adventure and Palace of Relaxation, the "Sauna World" has another 1,750 m2.

It contains twelve water slides up to 250 metres long (the longest in the country), many pools, 450 m long water river, themed areas, artificial waves, Jacuzzis, diving cliff, bar, wellness, fitness or a physiotherapy. There is also a four-star hotel serving this park.

Gallery

References

Water parks in the Czech Republic
Buildings and structures in Prague-East District
2008 establishments in the Czech Republic
Amusement parks opened in 2008
Swimming venues in the Czech Republic
21st-century architecture in the Czech Republic